Tijjani Noslin (born 7 July 1999) is a Dutch professional footballer who plays as a forward for Fortuna Sittard.

Club career
Born in Amsterdam, Noslin moved to 's-Hertogenbosch aged 14 to join FC Den Bosch's academy, but was released and he returned to Amsterdam a year later. He later joined FC Twente's academy, but was released as an 18-year-old, with the club citing his lack of height. After a failed trial at an academy in Manchester, he signed for amateur Dutch side USV Hercules. He made 26 league appearances and scored 10 goals for Hercules between 2017 and 2020, prior to joining DHSC in summer 2020. After five league appearances for DHSC across the 2020–21 season, Noslin signed an amateur contract with TOP Oss over summer 2021. As Noslin was not under a professional contract at TOP Oss, he joined Eredivisie side Fortuna Sittard later that summer on a free transfer, and signed a three-year contract. He made his debut for the club on 18 September 2021 as a substitute in a 1–0 defeat to SC Heerenveen. He scored his first professional goal the following month with the opening goal of a 1–1 draw with Willem II after coming on as a half-time substitute.

References

1999 births
Living people
Dutch footballers
Footballers from Amsterdam
Association football forwards
FC Den Bosch players
FC Twente players
USV Hercules players
DHSC players
Fortuna Sittard players
Eredivisie players
Derde Divisie players
Dutch people of Surinamese descent